Saturn's Children may refer to:
 the children of Saturn (mythology) in Roman myth; Saturn, fearing his children usurping him, ate them at birth
 Saturn's Children (Duncan and Hobson book), a 1995 political science book by Alan Duncan and Dominic Hobson
 Saturn's Children (novel), a 2008 science fiction novel by Charlie Stross

See also
 Saturn Devouring His Son, a painting by Francisco Goya